Gonopods are specialized appendages of various arthropods used in reproduction or egg-laying. In males, they facilitate the transfer of sperm from male to female during mating, and thus are a type of intromittent organ. In crustaceans and millipedes, gonopods are modified walking or swimming legs. Gonopods may be highly decorated with elaborate structures which may play roles in sperm competition, and can be used to differentiate and identify closely related species. Gonopods generally occur in one or more pairs, as opposed to the single (un-paired) reproductive organs such as the aedeagus of insects or the penis of harvestmen.

Insects

In insects, gonopods are appendages of the genital segment that may be used in insemination, or that comprise the egg-laying apparatus.

Crustaceans

In male decapod crustaceans, gonopods are modified swimming appendages (pleopods). The anterior two pair of pleopods in males are modified for sperm transferring, with differing degree of morphological diversification.

Millipedes

In millipedes, gonopods consist of one or two pairs of often highly modified walking legs in mature males, and are primarily found in members of the subgroup Helminthomorpha—containing most orders and the vast majority of species—where they are located on the seventh body segment consisting of leg pairs 8 and/or 9. Males of the subgroup Pentazonia (which includes the Oniscomorpha (pill millipedes) and Glomeridesmida) lack gonopods but possess enlarged appendages known as telopods at the rear of the body used to firmly hold females during mating. The complex structure of gonopods is a primary method of distinguishing closely related species of millipede, although the terminology used to describe the same structures may vary between authors. The complex morphology of millipede gonopods may be driven by sperm competition or other forms of sexual selection, with some structures serving to scoop out or displace sperm of other males, and others acting to stimulate females into becoming sexually receptive.

Millipede gonopods do not produce sperm directly, but rather gather sperm produced from a gonopore on the base of the third body segment.

Gonopods develop gradually during the growth of an individual. In early developmental stages, all legs are of the walking type, and cannot be used to determine sex. Through successive molts, the walking legs metamorphose into mature gonopods.

See also

Gonopodium, a modified fin for sperm transfer found in some fish
Claspers, pelvic fins modified for copulation in cartilaginous fish
Pedipalps, appendages of arachnids involved in sperm-transfer

References

Arthropod anatomy
Sex organs